Mohammad Toklis Ahmed (born 2 October 1995) is a Bangladeshi footballer who plays as a forward and last played for Mohammadan SC in the Bangladesh Premier League.

Achievements
 
Sheikh Jamal Dhanmondi Club
 Bangladesh Premier League (2)
 2013–14, 2014–15
 Federation Cup (2)
 2013–14, 2014–15
 King's Cup (Bhutan)
2014

International goals

Olympic Team

National Team

Note: As Northern Mariana Islands was not a full member of FIFA, the goals against them would not be counted as FIFA List A goals.

References 

1995 births
Living people
Bangladeshi footballers
Bangladesh international footballers
Sheikh Jamal Dhanmondi Club players
Association football forwards
Mohammedan SC (Dhaka) players
Footballers at the 2014 Asian Games
Asian Games competitors for Bangladesh
Team BJMC players
Bangladesh Football Premier League players